Luis Ricardo Guevara Mora (born 2 September 1961) is a Salvadoran former footballer who played as a goalkeeper.

Nicknamed el Negro, he became a member of the El Salvador national team and represented his country at the 1982 FIFA World Cup. Guevara remains one of El Salvador's best goalkeepers. He was known for his outstanding reflexes, leaping ability and acrobatic style of play, as well as his controversial antics off the field, which also earned him another nickname, 'el Loco'. He is the all-time cap leader for El Salvador national team.

Club career
In his early years, Guevara was a baseball and basketball enthusiast despite future national team goalkeeper Raúl Antonio García being one of his friends in school. He was tempted to train with Coca-Cola by former national team goalkeeper Raúl Magaña and then joined Platense to make his senior league debut at 16 years. He then played for Atlético Marte. He played for Once Lobos and again for Marte but since the fans still blamed him for the 10–1 drubbing by Hungary he left for Guatemala in the end, to play for Club Xelajú MC and Aurora F.C. He only returned to his country after five years and spent time again at Atlético Marte before retiring at Alianza in 2000. He then became goalkeeper coach at the national team but returned to Atlético Marte as a player-coach when they were relegated to the Salvadoran Second Division. Finally, he retired again at San Salvador F.C. to become a manager.

International career
At the age of 17, he was called up to play a friendly game against Panama in April 1979. He became the youngest goalkeeper in the national team's history.

Prior to the 1982 World Cup finals, during the qualification rounds, he only conceded one goal and played in a memorable victory against Mexico. At the finals tournament in Spain, he became one of the youngest goalkeepers to participate in the World Cup. In the first round, El Salvador lost to Hungary 10–1, and Guevara became the goalkeeper with the most goals scored against in a single match, a record that stands as of 2019.

He played 91 times for his national team in which he earned 50 senior caps. He represented his country in 13 World Cup qualification matches. His final international game was a November 1996 FIFA World Cup qualification match against Panama.

Personal life
Guevara is married to Flor de María and the couple have three children: Luis Ricardo, Ana Luisa and Gabriel Sebastián.

Honours
 Primera División de Fútbol de El Salvador: 1981, 1992, 1997, 1999, 2003

 Guatemalan Premier League: 1993

References

External links
 

1961 births
Living people
Sportspeople from San Salvador
Salvadoran footballers
Association football goalkeepers
El Salvador international footballers
1982 FIFA World Cup players
C.D. Atlético Marte footballers
C.D. Águila footballers
Xelajú MC players
Aurora F.C. players
Alianza F.C. footballers
San Salvador F.C. footballers
Salvadoran expatriate footballers
Salvadoran expatriate sportspeople in Guatemala
Expatriate footballers in Guatemala